Harpendyreus boma is a butterfly in the family Lycaenidae. It is found in Tanzania (from the southern part of the country to the highlands).

References

Endemic fauna of Tanzania
Butterflies described in 1926
Harpendyreus